The men's 4 × 300 metres relay event at the 1967 European Indoor Games was held on 11 and 12 March in Prague. Each athlete ran two laps of the 150 metres track.

Results

Heats
First 2 teams in each heat (Q) qualified directly for the final.

Final

References

4 × 400 metres relay at the European Athletics Indoor Championships
Relay